The discography of American country music artist Sara Evans consists of ten studio albums, three compilation albums, two extended plays, one video album, three additional albums, 39 singles, and four other charted songs. After briefly recording with "E and S Records", Evans reworked her musical direction and signed with RCA Nashville in 1997. Her debut album, Three Chords and the Truth, was released in July 1997. Although the singles were unsuccessful, it was critically acclaimed. Her second studio album was released in September 1998 entitled No Place That Far. The title track reached the top of the Billboard Hot Country Singles and Tracks chart. The success helped the album earn gold certification in the United States. Evans' third studio album, Born to Fly, was released in October 2000. Born to Fly reached number six on the Top Country Albums chart and the top-sixty of the Billboard 200. Its title track became her second number-one hit on the Hot Country Songs chart. The album also spawned the hits "I Could Not Ask for More", "Saints & Angels", and "I Keep Looking". It is the best-selling album of Evans' career, having been certified 2× platinum in the United States. In August 2003, she released the pop-inspired Restless, whose lead single "Perfect" reached the Top 5. Restless was certified platinum in the United States shortly after the success of its third single "Suds in the Bucket", which became Evans' third number one hit.

Evans' fifth studio album, Real Fine Place, was released in October 2005; it became her first record to debut at number one on the Billboard Top Country Albums chart, for selling one hundred thirty thousand copies in its first week. It also debuted at number three on the Billboard 200. "A Real Fine Place to Start" was its lead single and peaked on the top spot of the Hot Country Songs chart, while the second single "Cheatin'" reached the Top 10. After filing for divorce in 2006, Evans delayed the release of new music. Instead, a greatest hits package was issued, and its first single "As If" became a major hit. In March 2011, Evans issued Stronger, her first studio album in six years. It became her second effort to top the Billboard Top Country Albums chart and its first single, "A Little Bit Stronger" became Evans' fifth number one hit. Her seventh studio album, Slow Me Down, was released in March 2014. That album's title track peaked at number 19 on the Hot Country Songs chart, making Evans one of four female country artists to have a Top 40 hit in 2014. Evans's ninth studio album Words was released in July 2017 and debuted at number 4 on the Top Country Albums chart.

Albums

Studio albums

Compilation albums

Live albums

Extended plays

Singles

As lead artist

As a featured artist

Promotional singles

Other charted songs

Videography

Video albums

Music videos

Other appearances

Notes

References

External links 
 Official Website
 Sara Evans discography at Discogs

Country music discographies
 
 
Discographies of American artists